Daniel is a 2019 Danish biographical film directed by Niels Arden Oplev, and based on a book by .

References

External links 

2010s biographical films
2019 films
2010s Danish-language films
Danish biographical films
Films directed by Niels Arden Oplev
Films with screenplays by Anders Thomas Jensen